Council elections for the Borough of Chorley were held on 5 May 2022 as part of the 2022 United Kingdom local elections.

A third of the council was up for election. The result was a hold for the ruling Labour group.

Results summary

The results of the 2022 elections are summarised below.

Ward results

Adlington & Anderton

Buckshaw & Whittle

Chorley East

Chorley North & Astley

Chorley North East

Chorley North West

Chorley South East & Heath Charnock

Chorley South West

Clayton East, Brindle & Hoghton

Clayton West & Cuerden

Coppull

Croston, Mawdesley & Euxton South

Eccleston, Heskin & Charnock Richard

Euxton

References

Chorley
Chorley Borough Council elections
May 2022 events in the United Kingdom
2020s in Lancashire